Alfred Tarnowski (3 March 1917 – 24 November 2003) was a Polish chess player who won the Polish Chess Championship in 1961.

Chess career
Started to play chess in his native Lviv, where Tarnowski lived until 1945. After the end of World War II he moved to Kraków. In 1946 Tarnowski made his debut in the first post-war Polish Chess Championship in Sopot, where he shared seventh place. In the next years he twelve times in the Polish Chess Championship's finals and won two medals: a silver in 1949 in Poznań and gold in 1961 in Katowice. Tarnowski was the participant of eight international chess tournaments.

Also Tarnowski was a chess coach and theorist. In 1950 he won the theoretically valuable party against grandmaster Mark Taimanov.

Alfred Tarnowski played for Poland in Chess Olympiads:
 In 1952, at first board in the 10th Chess Olympiad in Helsinki (+4, =4, -6),
 In 1958, at second board in the 13th Chess Olympiad in Munich (+5, =8, -2),
 In 1960, at third board in the 14th Chess Olympiad in Leipzig (+4, =8, -3),
 In 1962, at fourth board in the 15th Chess Olympiad in Varna (+6, =1, -5).

References

External links
 
 

1917 births
2003 deaths
Polish chess players
Chess Olympiad competitors
Sportspeople from Lviv
20th-century chess players